Predrag Ristanović (born 29 September 1972) is a Serbian football manager and former player.

Playing career
Ristanović made his senior debut for Sloboda Užice in the 1990–91 Yugoslav First League. He later played for Javor Ivanjica and Mladost Lučani.

Managerial career
Ristanović started his managerial career at Sloboda Užice (December 2004–April 2007). He later served as manager of numerous clubs in his homeland, including Serbian SuperLiga side Javor Ivanjica (November 2013–March 2014).

References

External links
 

Association football defenders
First League of Serbia and Montenegro players
FK Javor Ivanjica managers
FK Javor Ivanjica players
FK Kolubara managers
FK Mladost Lučani players
FK Radnički 1923 managers
FK Sloboda Užice managers
FK Sloboda Užice players
Serbia and Montenegro footballers
Serbian football managers
Serbian footballers
Serbian SuperLiga managers
Sportspeople from Užice
Yugoslav First League players
Yugoslav footballers
1972 births
Living people